Gorbovo is a rural locality (a village) in Novlenskoye Rural Settlement, Vologodsky District, Vologda Oblast, Russia. The population was 9 as of 2002.

Geography 
The distance to Vologda is 67 km, to Novlenskoye is 7 km. Pavlovo, Kryukovo, Bedrino, Yeremeyevo, Makarovo, Filyutino, Gorka-Ilyinskaya are the nearest rural localities.

References 

Rural localities in Vologodsky District